The Pelagie Islands, from the Greek ,  meaning "open sea", are the three small islands of Lampedusa, Lampione, and Linosa, located in the Mediterranean Sea between Malta and Tunisia, south of Sicily. To the northwest lie the island of Pantelleria and the Strait of Sicily. All three islands are part of the comune of Lampedusa. Geographically, part of the archipelago (Lampedusa and Lampione) belongs to the African continent;  politically and administratively the islands fall within the Sicilian province of Agrigento and represent the southernmost part of Italy.

Despite pockets of agriculture, the islands are unnaturally barren due to wanton deforestation and the disappearance of the native olive groves, juniper and carob plantations. Fifty years ago much of the landscape was farmland bounded by dry stone walls but today, the local economy is based on fishing – sponge fishing and canning – supplemented by tourism in Lampedusa.

Environment

Birds
The Pelagie Islands have been recognised as an Important Bird Area (IBA) by BirdLife International because they support breeding populations of Scopoli's shearwaters and European shags.

Marine protected area

Of particular ecological concern in the islands is the protection of the loggerhead sea turtle (Caretta caretta) which is endangered throughout the Mediterranean as a result of its nesting sites being taken over by tourism. The  nature reserve, covering all three islands, was instituted in 2002.

See also
 List of islands of Italy

References

 
Archipelagoes of Italy
Important Bird Areas of Italy
Important Bird Areas of Mediterranean islands